Natasha Barrett may refer to:
 Natasha Barrett (television reporter), American broadcast journalist
 Natasha Barrett (composer) (born 1972), British contemporary music composer